Tony Robinson is a TV presenter and actor.

Tony Robinson may also refer to:
Tony Robinson (American football) (born 1964), former American football quarterback
Tony Robinson (bishop) (born 1956), Bishop of Pontefract
Tony Robinson (politician) (born 1962), Australian politician
Tony Robinson (shooting victim) (born c. 1996), killed by police in Madison, Wisconsin in 2015
Tony Robinson (speech recognition), British pioneer of recurrent neural networks

See also
Anthony Robinson (disambiguation)